The Çelebi Sultan Mehmed Mosque, also known as the Bayezid Mosque (Τέμενος Βαγιαζήτ) and the Great Mosque ( or Ulu Camii), is an early 15th-century Ottoman mosque in Didymoteicho, East Macedonia and Thrace, in the far northeast of Greece.

Construction
The 17th-century Ottoman traveller Evliya Çelebi records that the mosque was begun under Sultan Bayezid I (r. 1389–1402), but after his death at the Battle of Ankara and the turmoil that followed, it was interrupted. Construction was taken up again under Sultan Mehmed I (r. 1413–1421), and the mosque was completed and inaugurated in March 1420, as recorded in the inscription above the main entrance. A second inscription over a side-entrance records the name of the architect Ivaz ibn Bayezid, the builder (donor) Dogan ibn Abdullah and the local qadi, Seyid Ali, who supervised construction.

Structure
The mosque is a square structure, approximately 30–32m on each side, including the walls. The mosque is built with cast stone technique and faced with limestone ashlar blocks, and its external walls are ca. 2.2–2.7m thick. There are two rows of windows, one at floor level and one above. The main entrance is on the south side, and secondary doors are on the eastern and western sides.

From its layout, the building was apparently originally designed to be crowned by two large domes on the entrance axis, flanked by two smaller ones, while provision was made for addition of a portico surmounted by three smaller domes. The original design was abandoned and was replaced by a lead-covered wooden roof in the shape of a four-sided pyramid, which survives to this day. An interior roof of veneered wooden planks with a cupola, suspended below the actual roof, was added in the 17th century.

The interior space is divided by four square-piers into a central square, which served as the main prayer area, and four elongated spaces around it. The mihrab is located on the southern wall, with a fresco depicting a heavenly city above it. The other walls are decorated with quotes from the Quran, prayers and invocations. The minaret is located on the south-eastern corner. Its upper portion was demolished in 1912, during the Bulgarian occupation in the First Balkan War, when it was converted into a church dedicated to Saint George, but rebuilt in 1913 when the Turks recovered the town. A second balcony was added to the minaret at that time.

Importance and preservation

The mosque is considered by Greek government officials one of the most important Muslim monuments, not only in Greece, but in all of Europe, as being the oldest mosque on European ground. It has been a protected monument since 1946.

The early 15th-century oak roof constitutes "one of the most important wooden monuments in the world" according to A. Bakirtzis, author of a study on Ottoman architecture in Greece. The original lead sheathing was removed in the Second World War, and was replaced post-war first with sheet-metal covers, and later again with lead ones. These were removed in 1998 for repairs to the roof, but work stalled, and the roof was covered by a protective membrane instead, but this was torn in 2008, when a piece of the minaret fell on it.

The structure remained in urgent need of repair, and was considered particularly endangered by a possible earthquake. Finally, on 23 November 2010, the Central Archaeological Council decided on the resumption of restoration work, which is to be funded by national sources as well as using EU funding programmes.

In the early hours of 22 March 2017, during the course of restoration work on the roof, the mosque caught fire. The fire was extinguished after a few hours, but the entire roof was destroyed; damage to the interior and the walls remains unknown.

See also 
 List of former mosques in Greece
 List of mosques in Greece

References

External links

 

Buildings and structures completed in 1420
15th-century mosques
Didymoteicho
Ottoman mosques in Greece
Former mosques in Greece
15th-century architecture in Greece
Ottoman Thrace
Buildings and structures in Evros (regional unit)